The Mongolia men's national under-18 ice hockey team is the men's national under-18 ice hockey team of Mongolia. The team is controlled by the Mongolian Ice Hockey Federation, a member of the International Ice Hockey Federation.

History
The Mongolia men's national under-18 ice hockey team played its first game in 2000 against New Zealand during the 2000 IIHF Asian Oceanic Junior U18 Championship Division II tournament being held in Bangkok, Thailand. Mongolia lost the game 1–5 and finished the tournament in last place. The following year the team finished first in the Division II tournament at the 2001 IIHF Asian Oceanic U18 Championship and were set to gain promotion to Division I but due to a format change both divisions were merged for the 2002 IIHF Asian Oceanic U18 Championship. During the tournament Mongolia achieved their largest victory in international participation when they defeated Thailand 12–1. At the 2002 IIHF Asian Oceanic U18 Championship Mongolia finished fourth after winning two of their five games, beating both Chinese Taipei and Thailand. After a six-year absence from international competition the under-18 team returned to compete in the 2008 IIHF World U18 Championships Division III Group A being held in Mexico City, Mexico. They finished in last place after losing all five of their games. The following year they again finished in last place and also suffered their largest defeat in international competition after losing to Australia 0–33. In 2011 Mongolian under-18 were set to play at their fourth World Championships however the Mongolian Ice Hockey Federation had to withdraw both the under-18 team and the men's senior team from their respective tournaments due to financial reasons.

International competitions
2000 IIHF Asian Oceanic Junior U18 Championship. Finish: 4th in Division II  (8th overall)
2001 IIHF Asian Oceanic U18 Championship. Finish: 1st in Division II (5th overall)
2002 IIHF Asian Oceanic U18 Championship. Finish: 4th
2008 IIHF World U18 Championships. Finish: 5th in Division III Group A (42nd overall)
2009 IIHF World U18 Championships. Finish: 5th in Division III Group A (43rd overall)
2010 IIHF World U18 Championships. Finish: 5th in Division III Group A (44th overall)
2023 IIHF Ice Hockey U18 Asia and Oceania Championship. Finish: 3rd place

Fixtures and Results

2000

2001

2002

2008

2009

2010

2023
All times are local (UTC+8)

References

Ice hockey in Mongolia
National under-18 ice hockey teams
Ice hockey